Matt Thomas (born May 11, 1986) is an American guitarist residing in Virginia Beach, Virginia.  He is noted for his work on the harp guitar and acoustic guitar.

Achievements and awards 
 1st place National Contemporary Thumbpicking 2006
 1st place National Open Thumbpicking 2006
 National Thumbpicking Grand Champion 2006 
 1st Place International Open Thumbpicking 2007
 Kentucky Hall of Fame Inductee 2007 
 Winfield 3rd place International Fingerstyle Championship 2017
 1st Place International Fingerstyle Collective Championship 2019

Studio albums 
Man on the Moon, 2017, Cimirron

Endorsements and equipment 
Larrivee 
Mayson Guitars 
Tonedevil Guitars
Grace Design Preamps

References

External links 
 

1986 births
Living people
American male guitarists